Edward J. Sparling (1896-1981) was an educator who was the founder of Roosevelt University in Chicago, Illinois.

Edward Sparling was born in Panoche, California in 1896. Sparling received a B.A. from Stanford University and his Master's and Ph.D. from Columbia University where he lived in the International House of New York. During World War I, Sparling served in the U.S. Army as a flying instructor. In 1936 to 1945 Sparling became president of Central YMCA College in Chicago and served there until 1945 when he incorporated Roosevelt College, which would admit students regardless of race or religion. The college became a university in 1954 and Sparling stepped down as president in 1963. He retired to Pleasanton, California where he died in 1981. He authored several works including "Do College Students Choose Vocations Wisely?"

References

1896 births
1981 deaths
University and college founders
Columbia University alumni
Writers from Chicago
People from San Benito County, California
Stanford University alumni